The 2020 Clemson Tigers football team represented Clemson University during the 2020 NCAA Division I FBS football season. The Tigers were led by head coach Dabo Swinney, in his 12th full year. The Tigers competed as a member of the Atlantic Coast Conference (ACC) and played their home games at Memorial Stadium in Clemson, South Carolina.

The season was played amidst the ongoing COVID-19 pandemic. The ACC settled on an eleven-game football schedule, with ten conference games with no divisions and one non-conference game. Clemson canceled their previously scheduled non-conference games against Akron and South Carolina, and kept their game against The Citadel. Precautions were taken to reduce the spread of the virus, including testing, isolation requirements, and limitations on the number of fans in attendance.

Clemson began the year ranked first in the preseason AP Poll, and handily won their first seven games of the season, including a 42–17 win over then-No. 9 Miami (FL). Starting quarterback Trevor Lawrence tested positive for COVID-19 on October 29, and was forced to miss the team's next two games against Boston College and temporary ACC member Notre Dame. The team escaped with a close win against Boston College, but lost on the road to then-No. 4 Notre Dame in double overtime, 47–40. Clemson won the remainder of their regular season games, and earned a place in the ACC Championship Game by finishing second in the division-less format with an 8–1 record, behind Notre Dame. In the rematch against the Fighting Irish, this time with Lawrence at quarterback, the Tigers were victorious by a score of 34–10, to win their sixth consecutive ACC title. In the final College Football Playoff rankings of the season, Clemson was ranked second, earning them a place in the national semifinal to be played at the Sugar Bowl against third-seeded Ohio State, a rematch of the previous season's Fiesta Bowl. Clemson lost the rematch, 49–28, to end the season at 10–2 and ranked third in the final polls.

Junior quarterback Trevor Lawrence led the team on offense with 3,153 passing yards and 24 passing touchdowns. He was named ACC Player of the Year and finished second in voting for the Heisman Trophy. The team's leading rusher was Travis Etienne, who was named a consensus All-American all-purpose back. Amari Rodgers was the team's leading receiver and was named first-team all-conference. On defense, the team featured two first-team all-conference members in lineman Bryan Bresee and cornerback Derion Kendrick. Bresee was named the ACC Defensive Freshman of the Year.

Previous season
The Tigers finished the 2019 season 14–1, and 8–0 in ACC play. They won the ACC for the fifth consecutive season by beating Virginia in the ACC Championship game, 62–17. The Tigers were selected to the College Football Playoff as the third seed.  In the semifinals, the Tigers defeated Ohio State 29–23.  They advanced to the CFP National Championship game, where they were defeated by LSU 42–25.

Offseason

Recruiting

Clemson's 2020 recruiting class consisted of 23 signees. The class was ranked as the best class in the ACC and the third best class overall according to the 247Sports Composite.

Offseason departures

NFL draftees

Undrafted free agents

Transfers

Preseason

Award watch lists
Listed in the order that they were released

Schedule
Clemson had games scheduled against Akron and South Carolina, which were both canceled due to the COVID-19 pandemic. This will be the first season since 1908 that the Tigers do not play South Carolina.

The ACC released their schedule format on July 29, with specific dates selected at a later date.  Specific game dates were released on August 6, 2020.

Rankings

Personnel

Coaching staff

Roster

Game summaries

at Wake Forest

Citadel

Virginia

Miami

at Georgia Tech

Syracuse

Boston College

at Notre Dame

Pittsburgh

at Virginia Tech

vs. Notre Dame

vs. Ohio State

Awards and honors

Players drafted into the NFL

References

Clemson
Clemson Tigers football seasons
Atlantic Coast Conference football champion seasons
Clemson Tigers football